This is a list of Kebbi State administrators and Governors of Kebbi State. 
Kebbi State was formed on 27 August 1991, when it was split off from Sokoto State.

References

Kebbi
Governors